The 2017 Northamptonshire County Council election took place on 4 May 2017 as part of the 2017 local elections in the United Kingdom. All 57 councillors were elected from electoral divisions which return one county councillor each by first-past-the-post voting for a four-year term of office.

Results summary

|}

Results by Division

Corby

Daventry

East Northamptonshire

Kettering

Northampton

South Northamptonshire

Wellingborough

References

2017
2017 English local elections
2010s in Northamptonshire